Saint-André-le-Désert is a commune in the Saône-et-Loire department in the region of Bourgogne-Franche-Comté in eastern France.

See also
Communes of the Saône-et-Loire department

References
http://st-andre-le-desert.fr

Communes of Saône-et-Loire